Night of the Living Dead may refer to:

Film
Night of the Living Dead (film series), a series of 6 horror films directed by George A. Romero
Night of the Living Dead (1968), the first film in the series, and subsequent revisions Night of the Living Dead: 30th Anniversary Edition (1999) and Night of the Living Dead: Reanimated (2010)
Night of the Living Dead (1990 film), a remake of the 1968 film directed by Tom Savini
Night of the Living Dead 3D (2006), a second remake directed by Jeff Broadstreet
Night of the Living Dead 3D: Re-Animation, a 2012 prequel
Mimesis: Night of the Living Dead (2011), the film that is not meant as a remake; instead, to address themes of obsessed fans
Night of the Living Dead: Resurrection (2012), a third remake directed by James Plumb
Night of the Living Dead: Darkest Dawn (2015), a computer animated re-telling of the 1968 film
Night of the Animated Dead (2021), an animated remake directed by Jason Axinn
Night of the Living Dead II (2023), a sequel of the 1968 film directed by Marcus Slabine

Music
Night of the Living Dead (album), by Jackyl, 1996
"Night of the Living Dead" (song), by Misfits, 1979

See also

 "Knight of the Living Dead", a 2008 single by Stone Gods